Warley is a constituency in the House of Commons of the UK Parliament. The constituency was established in 1997, and has been represented since that date by John Spellar, a member of the Labour Party.

Members of Parliament

Constituency profile
The constituency has a wide range of housing on the gently hilly West Midlands terrain, with fast transport links to Birmingham, Dudley and Wolverhampton.  Workless claimants, registered jobseekers, were in November 2012 significantly higher than the national average of 3.8%, at 7.7% of the population based on a statistical compilation by The Guardian however female unemployment, reflecting a central West Midlands pattern, perhaps with more women homemakers, unusually exceeded male unemployment at 10.1%.

Boundaries 

Warley is one of four constituencies covering the Metropolitan Borough of Sandwell, covering the south and south-east of the borough.  It covers much of the former County Borough of Warley, including the town of Smethwick as well as Brandhall and Langley Green.

It consists of The Metropolitan Borough of Sandwell wards of Abbey, Bristnall, Langley, Old Warley, St Paul's, Smethwick, and Soho and Victoria.

History 
Creation and forerunners
The constituency was formed in 1997, and is for the most part the former Warley East constituency. John Spellar of the Labour Party has represented Warley since 1997, having previously represented Warley West.  Warley East and Warley West had been held by Labour since their creation in 1974.  Minor parts of the seat around Oldbury had been in the quite marginal Labour-Conservative seat of Oldbury and Halesowen before 1974.

Results of winning party
The 2015 result made the seat the 34th-safest of Labour's 232 seats by percentage of majority. The elections have to date resulted in the Labour incumbent, Spellar, gaining more than 50% of votes cast.

Opposition parties
The candidates fielded by the Conservative Party have taken the runner-up position since the seat's creation.  Third place has varied between two parties to date in the seat's history.

Turnout
Turnout has ranged from 54.1% in 2001 to 65.1% in 1997.

Elections

Elections in the 2010s

Elections in the 2000s

Elections in the 1990s

See also 
 List of parliamentary constituencies in the West Midlands (county)

Notes

References

Parliamentary constituencies in the West Midlands (county)
Constituencies of the Parliament of the United Kingdom established in 1997
Politics of Sandwell